George Lamb (born 1979) is an English radio and TV presenter.

George Lamb may also refer to:

George Lamb (politician) (1784–1834), British member of parliament and writer
George Hamilton Lamb (1900–1943), Australian politician and prisoner-of-war

See also
George Lam (born 1947), Hong Kong singer